The Chocobo video game series is a spin-off series composed of over a dozen games developed by Square Co. and later by Square Enix featuring a super deformed version of the Chocobo, a Final Fantasy series mascot and fictional bird, as the protagonist. Several of the titles have received separate album releases of music from the game.  The music of the Chocobo series includes soundtrack albums for the Chocobo's Mysterious Dungeon sub-series—comprising Chocobo's Mysterious Dungeon, Chocobo's Dungeon 2, and Final Fantasy Fables: Chocobo's Dungeon—and soundtrack albums of music from Chocobo Racing, Final Fantasy Fables: Chocobo Tales, and Chocobo and the Magic Picture Book: The Witch, The Maiden, and the Five Heroes, as well as an album of arranged music from Chocobo's Mysterious Dungeon and a single entitled Chocobo no Fushigina Dungeon Toki Wasure No Meikyuu: Door Crawl for the theme song of Final Fantasy Fables: Chocobo's Dungeon.

The first album of the discography released was the soundtrack to Chocobo's Mysterious Dungeon, Chocobo no Fushigina Dungeon Original Soundtrack. It was released by DigiCube in 1997 and was reprinted by Square Enix in 2006. An arranged album of music from that game was released in under the title Chocobo no Fushigina Dungeon Coi Vanni Gialli by DigiCube in 1998, and soundtrack albums to Chocobo's Dungeon 2 and Chocobo Racing were released the following year, also by DigiCube. There were no further album releases in the series until 2006, when Square Enix produced a download-only soundtrack to Final Fantasy Fables: Chocobo Tales.  The latest releases in the series are the soundtrack to Final Fantasy Fables: Chocobo's Dungeon and a combined soundtrack for Chocobo Tales and The Witch, The Maiden, and the Five Heroes, both of which were released by Square Enix in 2008.

Concept and creation 

Masashi Hamauzu, the composer for Chocobo's Mysterious Dungeon, was not expecting to be assigned the soundtrack to the game.  In the liner notes for the original soundtrack album, he states that he was "still in high school when that lovable character first made his debut in Final Fantasy", but that the "Chocobo Theme" made a big impression on him, leading him to often think to himself that he would "love to try doing this kind of work". The soundtrack was the first solo album that Hamauzu had produced. When he wrote his own Chocobo themes for the Chocobo no Fushigina Dungeon Original Soundtrack, he decided to arrange the opening and ending of the album for a fifty-piece orchestra, which lead to the creation of the orchestrated Chocobo no Fushigina Dungeon Coi Vanni Gialli album.  In the liner notes for that album, he explains that his motivation for creating the orchestral works was because "Demand for classical music in Japan is still low compared with other countries" and he wanted "to spread the word on this style of music by any means necessary". He ends the note by exhorting his listeners to "take your time" with classical music such as the album, so that one day they will appreciate it.

Hamauzu has not been involved in the production of any other Chocobo soundtracks. Chocobo's Dungeon 2s soundtrack was composed by a group of five composers, and was the last Chocobo game soundtrack to not be mainly composed of remixes of previous Final Fantasy and Chocobo music. Hamauzu was not involved in the creation of either the remixes or original tracks for these albums. His role was filled by Kumi Tanioka for Final Fantasy Fables: Chocobo's Dungeon, Kenji Ito for Chocobo Racing, and Yuzo Takahashi for Chocobo and the Magic Picture Book: The Witch, The Maiden, and the Five Heroes.

Unlike the soundtracks to the numbered Final Fantasy games, no tracks from the Chocobo soundtracks have appeared in any compilation albums produced by Square Enix. Pieces from the series have also not appeared in any of the official Final Fantasy music concerts, although a piece based on the "Chocobo theme", "Swing de Chocobo", has been played at the 2005 More Friends concert in Los Angeles, the 2006 Voices concert in Japan, and in the worldwide Distant Worlds concert tour from 2007 to date. On February 6, 2011 the Australian Eminence Symphony Orchestra played a concert in Tokyo as part of the Game Music Laboratory concert series as a tribute to the music of Kenji Ito and Hiroki Kikuta. The concert included "Treasure Chest of the Heart" from Chocobo Racing, sung by Jillian Aversa.

 Albums 

 Chocobo's Mysterious Dungeon 

The Chocobos's Mysterious Dungeon games are a series of roguelike dungeon crawls and are part of the Fushigi no Dungeon, or Mystery Dungeon series. Each of the three games had a soundtrack album release, while Chocobo no Fushigina Dungeon additionally sparked an orchestral arrangement album subtitled Coi Vanni Gialli and Final Fantasy Fables: Chocobo's Dungeon additionally had a single release of its theme song titled Door Crawl.

 Chocobo no Fushigina Dungeon Original Soundtrack 

Chocobo no Fushigina Dungeon Original Soundtrack is the soundtrack for Chocobo no Fushigina Dungeon, or Chocobo's Mysterious Dungeon. It contains all of the tracks from the game, and was composed by Masashi Hamauzu and released by DigiCube on December 21, 1997, with a re-release by Square Enix on February 1, 2006. The album included a bonus mini-CD containing two orchestral arrangements of the main theme.  Both the opening and ending themes of the soundtrack are orchestrated, while the rest of the tracks use a synthesizer; the tracks have been described as "very upbeat" and "fun-lovin' light-hearted". Five of the tracks incorporate the "Chocobo Theme" from the Final Fantasy series as part of the theme, namely "Chocobo's House", "Chocobo Village", "After the Battle", "Let's Have a Dream", and "Courage". The release spans two discs, including the bonus mini-CD, and has a duration of 1:11:37.

Chocobo no Fushigina Dungeon Original Soundtrack was well received by critics; Patrick Gann of RPGFan praised it, saying that it could be "some of the most creative musical work to come from Squaresoft" and that the album was full of "very upbeat and fun-lovin' light-hearted goodness from Hamauzu." He especially liked the included mini-CD, claiming that it made the album "a worthwhile purchase on its own". Kero Hazel of Square Enix Music Online agreed, terming the album a "solid winner" and praising its ability to be enjoyed both as background music and with active listening. Hazel also praised Hamauzu's "flexible" use of the "Chocobo" theme. Dave of Square Enix Music Online, however, while still recommending the album as a "good score", felt that the lighter themes of the soundtrack were lacking in depth, leaving the darker themes to "provide the listener with any substance".Track list'''

 Chocobo no Fushigina Dungeon Coi Vanni Gialli Chocobo no Fushigina Dungeon Coi Vanni Gialli is an arranged album of music from Chocobo no Fushigina Dungeon. The subtitle "Coi Vanni Gialli" is archaic Italian and means "With the Yellow Wings".  The album, composed by Masashi Hamauzu, is composed of 11 orchestral arrangements of pieces from the Chocobo no Fushigina Dungeon soundtrack. The pieces have been described as ranging from "fast paced and exciting" to "cute little music box-esque adaptation[s]". The album was released by DigiCube on February 5, 1998, and spans 40:52 with its 11 tracks.

Like the original soundtrack, Chocobo no Fushigina Dungeon Coi Vanni Gialli was well received by critics. Damian Thomas of RPGFan called it "a wonderful soundtrack, blending both cuteness and energy" and claimed that "none of the tracks on this CD fall short of excellence". Chris of Square Enix Music Online said that there was "very little to criticize about the album" and quoted the liner notes of the album in saying that the album was "the debut of a composer of genius". He recommended the album as a good introduction to new listeners of Hamauzu's music, while also stating that "one cannot possibly be a comprehensive Hamauzu fan without listening to it". The album was also recommended by Dave of Square Enix Music Online as superior to the original soundtrack.

 Chocobo's Dungeon 2 Chocobo no Fushigina Dungeon 2 Original Soundtrack is the soundtrack for Chocobo's Dungeon 2. It was composed by Kumi Tanioka, Yasuhiro Kawakami, Tsuyoshi Sekito, and Kenji Ito, with reprises from Nobuo Uematsu. It was released by DigiCube on January 21, 1999. The album contains all of the tracks from the game, as well as two tracks used in television commercials for Chocobo's Dungeon 2. The album has been described as "light-hearted", with "no real driving songs". The album is 45 tracks on only one disc, and has a duration of 1:05:40.Chocobo no Fushigina Dungeon 2 Original Soundtrack was moderately well received by reviewers.  Patrick Gann said that despite the flaws of the game, the soundtrack "held strong" and claimed that anyone could enjoy the album, "given the right atmosphere". Chris of Square Enix Music Online termed it "a decent effort" and a "coherent and thorough work". He especially praised the contributions of Sekito and Ito, though he was termed the tracks from Kawakami and Tanioka "unmemorable". He concluded that while there were no poor tracks on the album, several of the themes were "limited thematically and emotionally" and he could not recommend the soundtrack to a wide audience.

It was arranged by Yuzo Takahashi of Joe Down Studio, a Hokkaido-based music development studio. The title track and opening theme—both original to the soundtrack—were composed by Kumi Tanioka, while the final track "Door Crawl" was written and sung by Ai Kawashima. Other composers whose works were used are Nobuo Uematsu, Naoshi Mizuta, Masashi Hamauzu, Junya Nakano, and Kenji Ito. The album was released by Square Enix on January 23, 2008 with the catalog number SQEX-10104.

The album was well received by critics such as Jeriaska of RPGFan, who enjoyed the arrangements, particularly those of pieces from games early in the Final Fantasy series. He praised Joe Down Studios for not falling into the trap of "introducing a veneer of self-importance" that he felt was common in remakes of early Final Fantasy pieces. Chris of Square Enix Music Online also liked the album, saying that the arrangements "make many tracks sound better than they've ever sounded before". His largest complaint about the album was that it does not include every track from the game, some of which he was interested in hearing. He ascribed the exclusions to the publisher's desire to release the soundtrack as a single disc, and concluded that the album was still a "very enjoyable overall experience".

"Door Crawl", the theme song of Chocobo's Dungeon, was released as a single entitled Chocobo no Fushigina Dungeon Toki Wasure No Meikyuu: Door Crawl. The album was released by Toshiba EMI on December 12, 2007. It has a length of 14:18, and contains three tracks. The disc was Kawashima's 15th single; it reached #20 on the Oricon Weekly Charts and sold 6,520 copies in its first week. Lex of Square Enix Music Online had mixed feelings about the single, saying that "Door Crawl" was "a pleasant and laid back listen", but that "Colorless Thing" was "nothing special" and that "Light" was "ruined" by the synth instruments.

Chocobo RacingChocobo Racing Original Soundtrack is the soundtrack for  composed by Kenji Ito. First released by DigiCube on March 25, 1999, it was later re-released by Square Enix on October 1, 2008. The album is 30 tracks and 57:00 long. The only original theme in the soundtrack is "Treasure Chest of the Heart", a Japanese song orchestrated by Shirō Hamaguchi and performed by Hiromi Ohta. In the English version of the game, it is performed by Vicki Bell. The remaining tracks are arrangements of Final Fantasy tracks.  The predominant theme to the tracks selected is the Chocobo theme from the Final Fantasy series, with eight of the tracks based on it. The album was appreciated by Kie of Square Enix Music Online, who felt that Ito's "arrangements of classic themes are done with great skill". He especially liked "Mithril Mines" and "Treasure Chest of the Heart", but felt that many of the tracks did not match up to the quality of the best few.

 Chocobo and the Magic Books 

The Chocobo and the Magic Books mini-series comprises Chocobo to Mahou no Ehon, released in North America as Final Fantasy Fables: Chocobo Tales and literally translating to Chocobo and the Magic Picture Book, as well as its to-date Japan-only sequel, Chocobo to Mahō no Ehon: Majō to Shōjo to Gonin no Yūsha, translated as Chocobo and the Magic Picture Book: The Witch, The Maiden, and the Five Heroes. Neither game has received a separate full soundtrack release; Chocobo Tales produced a download-only album on iTunes titled The Best of Chocobo and the Magic Book Original Soundtrack, while together their soundtracks were released in full as the two-disc Chocobo and the Magic Books Original Soundtrack.  The majority of the tracks are either unchanged versions or arrangements of Final Fantasy and Chocobo compositions; Chocobo Tales contains only two original tracks—one of which is only eight seconds long—while its sequel has 12 original tracks out of 33.  The soundtracks for both games were composed by Yuzo Takahashi.  Magic Books contains 61 tracks across two discs, with a total length of 1:51:57; Best ofs 10 tracks span 26:16.  The tracks in Best of correspond to tracks 8, 1, 3, 9, 19, 25, 12, 18, 27, and 28 of the first disc of Magic Books, in that order.

While neither album has seen much attention from critics, The Best of Chocobo and the Magic Book Original Soundtrack was dismissed by Chris of Square Enix Music Online as "not a worthwhile sampler" of the soundtrack. Terming it a "truncated compilation", he criticized the track selection as including what were in his opinion some of the weakest arrangements while excluding the strongest, and concluded that the album serves no purpose given the subsequent release of the full soundtrack as part of The Best of Chocobo and the Magic Book Original Soundtrack. He was much more complimentary of the Magic Books album, saying that it "confirmed that Yuzo Takahashi is a bright young composer" and calling the arrangements and original compositions "both melodically engaging and stylistically versatile".Tracklist'''

References

External links 
 Official Masashi Hamauzu Site

Chocobo
Chocobo
Chocobo